Ventouris Ferries is a Greek company that operates ferry services from Italy to Greece and Albania.

Routes
Ventouris Ferries operates three routes across the Adriatic Sea.

Bari - Durres (Rigel II & Rigel III & Rigel VII)
Bari - Corfu - Igoumenitsa - Sami (Rigel VII) *summer season*

Fleet

Ventouris Ferries currently operates a fleet of four RORO ferries.

Former ships

References

Ferry companies of Greece
Companies based in Piraeus
Ferry companies of Italy